LP-44 is a drug which acts as a potent and selective agonist at the 5HT7 serotonin receptor. While LP-44 is less selective than the related compound LP-12, it has been more widely used in research and has been used to show the complex role of 5-HT7 receptors in several aspects of brain function, including regulation of the sleep-wake cycle and roles in stress, learning and memory.

See also
 AS-19
 E-55888
 LP-211

References

5-HT7 agonists
1-Aminotetralins
Phenylpiperazines